Veljko Bogićević (born 27 April 1999) is a Serbian footballer, who played for Borac Čačak.

Career statistics

References

External links
 
 
 

1999 births
Living people
Association football forwards
Serbian footballers
FK Borac Čačak players
Serbian SuperLiga players
Serbian First League players